Francesco Albizzi (24 October 1593 in Cesena – 5 October 1684, Rome) was an Italian cardinal. As a member of the Roman Inquisition, he worked to increase the standards of jurisprudence in Rome, and establish "rigorous standards of evidence and proof", particularly in regards to alleged cases of witchcraft.

Biography
Cardinal Albizzi was born in Cesena on 24 October 1593 to Tommaso Albizzi and Francesca Funetti. He obtained the degree of doctor in utroque iure at the University of Bologna, and began to teach civil and canon law there in 1611. Three years later, he married Violante Martinelli, by whom he had five children. After her death, he moved to Rome, where became closely connected with the Jesuits; and, through their influence, became secretary to certain prelates, and afterwards to the pope himself.

Around 1627, he became general auditor to Cesare Monti, Apostolic Nuncio to the Kingdom of Naples. The following year, when Monti was appointed to Spain, Albizzi accompanied him in the same capacity. Returning to Rome in 1635, he was named councilor of the Roman Inquisition, the final court of appeal in trials of heresy; and in 1636 referendary of the Apostolic Signatura. In 1636-37 he accompanied Cardinal Marzio Ginetti, Papal Legate to Austria. In 1653, he composed for Pope Innocent X the Cum occasione, a papal bull, condemning five propositions of Cornelius Jansen's Augustinus.

Cardinal
Pope Innocent X made him Cardinal-Priest of Santa Maria in Via on 2 March 1654; he was made a cardinal-inquisitor on 30 March. He wrote  De inconstantia in jure admittenda vel non which described the increased standards of evidence and proof required by the Roman Inquisition in cases of alleged witchcraft. Printed in 1683, it was circulated widely in areas subject to its jurisdiction.

During his Cardinalate he attended the Conclaves of conclave of 1655, 1667, 1669-70, and 1676 which elected Popes Alexander VII, Clement IX, Clement X and Innocent XI respectively. He was a member of the Squadrone Volante, a group of independent cardinals without allegiance to any particular national interest be it France or Spain. As such, they were able to exercise a good deal of influence in the election of a successor pope. They were therefore courted by both sides.

On 24 August 1671, he was made Cardinal-priest of Santi Quattro Coronati; on 8 January 1680, his title was changed to Cardinal-priest of Santa Maria in Trastevere. On 1 December 1861 he became Cardinal-priest Santa Prassede, which title he held until his death. He also became the Camerlengo of the Sacred College of Cardinals in January 1667.

Albizzi did not approve of the theories of Miguel de Molinos because, among other objections, it appeared to encourage the rejection of vocal prayer and the sacrament of confession, as had been seen in some convents of religious women. In 1682 he composed the Scripture on the prayer of quiet, in which he took a stand against quietism.

Cardinal Albizzi died in Rome on 5 October 1683, at the age of 90. At the time of his death he was the Oldest living Member of the Sacred College.

References

Notes

Sources
 Lucien Ceyssens O.F.M., Le cardinal François Albizzi (1593–1684). Un cas important dans l'histoire du jansénisme (Rome: Pontificium Athenaeum Antonianum, 1977).

External links
The Cardinals of the Holy Roman Church 

|-

|-

|-  

|-  

|-

1593 births
1684 deaths
17th-century Italian cardinals
People from Cesena